, abbreviated as NAIST, is a Japanese national university located in Ikoma, Nara of Kansai Science City. It was founded in 1991 with a focus on research and consists solely of graduate schools in three integrated areas: Biological Sciences, Information Sciences, and Material Sciences. NAIST is one of the most prestigious research institutions in Japan.

In the "Evaluation of Achievements Related to the 2nd Medium-term Goals and Plans" (2010-2015) conducted by the Japanese government for national universities, NAIST was evaluated as exceedingly superior especially concerning research levels. (One of 5 institutions from the 86 national universities). In 2010, NAIST ranked first overall among the 86 Japanese national universities by the Japanese government in its first-ever six-year (2005-2010)assessment of national university standards and achievements.

The university has a total of about 1,000 Master's and Doctoral students in its three graduate schools (2010), among which more than 20% are international students (2017). There are about 200 faculty members and 170 staff (2010).

In 2018, NAIST underwent an organizational transformation to continue research in these areas while promoting interdisciplinary research and education across traditional fields.

History
NAIST was founded in 1991 with the establishment of the Graduate School of Information Science and the University Library, followed by the Graduate School of Biological Sciences the next year. The first master's students were admitted in 1993, and doctoral students were first admitted in 1996, which is also the year the Graduate School of Materials Science was established. The establishment of the Venture Business Laboratory and the Intellectual Property Division in 2003 furthered the university's drive to utilize research results to secure patents and licenses, and form new businesses. In 2004, along with all of Japan's national universities, NAIST became an independent National University Corporation.

 1991: Establishment of the Nara Institute of Science and Technology, including the Graduate School of Information Science and University Library
 1992: Establishment of the Graduate School of Biological Sciences
 1993: Establishment of the Research and Education Center for Genetic Information
 1994: Establishment of the Research Center for Advanced Science and Technology
 1996: Establishment of the Graduate School of Materials Science
 1998: Establishment of the Research and Education Center for Materials Science
 2003: Establishment of the Venture Business laboratory
 April 2011: Establishment of Department of Information Science, Graduate School of Information Science | Establishment of Department of Biological Sciences, Graduate School of Biological Sciences
 April 2013: Establishment of Career Services Office 
 April 2015: Establishment of Center for Strategy and Planning established | Establishment of Institute for Educational Initiatives | Establishment of Institute for Research Initiatives| Closing of Center for International Relations | Closing of Institute of Research Initiatives
 April 2017: Establishment of Data Science Center 
 April 2018: Department of Science and Technology, Graduate School of Science and Technology established and students accepted (The merging of the Graduate School of Information Science, Graduate School of Biological Sciences and the Graduate School of Materials Science)

Organization

Graduate schools (After 2018)
From April 2018, the past three graduate schools (Graduate School of Information Sciences, Graduate School of Biological Sciences, Graduate School of Materials Science) were integrated into one research department, Graduate School of Science and Technology.

Graduate schools (Before 2017)
 Graduate School of Biological Sciences 
 Division of Plant Biology
 Division of Biomedical Science
 Division of Systems Biology
 Plant Global Education Project
 Global COE Program Special Research Group
 Graduate School of Information Science 
 Division of Computer Science
 Division of Media Informatics
 Division of Applied Informatics
 Graduate School of Materials Science

Centers and facilities
 Research and Education Center for Genetic Information
 Research and Education Center for Materials Science
 Information Initiative Center
 Center for Frontier Science and Technology 
 Center for Industry-Government-Academia Collaboration 
 Center for International Relations

Notable research
 ARToolKit
 ChaSen
 DyNet
 Induced pluripotent stem cell
 MeCab
 Natural language processing

Notable researchers
Shinya Yamanaka - Former professor, 2012 Nobel Prize for Physiology or Medicine winner
Kimito Funatsu - the research director of the Data Science Center, 2019 Herman Skolnik Award winner

Gallery

Notes and references

External links

 Official website

Educational institutions established in 1991
Japanese national universities
Nara Institute of Science and Technology
Engineering universities and colleges in Japan
1991 establishments in Japan
Kansai Science City